Rick Holbrook (May 22, 1948 in Chicago, Illinois – December 23, 2007) was an Olympic weightlifter for the United States.

About
Patrick Joseph "Rick" Holbrook, Jr. competed in his weightlifting competitions at 198 lbs standing at 5 foot 10 inches tall.

Organizations
Holbrook is a member of the York Barbell Club, York.

Career
Holbrook was known for his infamous speed and technique in his lifting. He was more successful in his quick lifts than the presses.

Personal Bests
In 1972, Holbrook worked his way up to lifting a total of 512.5 kg. He pressed 162.5 kg. snatched 155.0 kg. and 197.5 kg on the clean & jerk.

Weightlifting achievements
Olympic Games team member (1972)
Senior National Champion (1971 and 1972)
Competed in World Championships (1970 & 1971) taking 7th place in 1971
AAU champion (1971 & 1972) 
Named Best Lifter at AAUs (1972)
Won silver medal at Pan American Games (1971)

References

External links
Rick Holbrook - Hall of Fame at Weightlifting Exchange

American male weightlifters
Olympic weightlifters of the United States
Weightlifters at the 1972 Summer Olympics
1948 births
2007 deaths
Sportspeople from Chicago
Pan American Games medalists in weightlifting
Pan American Games gold medalists for the United States
Pan American Games silver medalists for the United States
Weightlifters at the 1971 Pan American Games
20th-century American people